Anikovik River (alternate Anakovik) is a waterway in the U.S. state of Alaska. As it leaves the mountains, it has a westerly course, but bending sharply to the south, it flows in that direction to the sea. In the upper part of its course, the river flows in greenstones, but below its bend, to the south, it cuts phyllites and slates.

Through the greater part of its length, it flows across the York Plateau, in which it has cut a comparatively broad valley. In 1900, the whole of this river was regarded as gold-placer ground, but eventually, all the workings were abandoned. The fine gold was generally bright, but the nuggets were iron stained. Cassiterite and magnetite were found with the gold in the concentrates.

References
 
 

Rivers of the Seward Peninsula
Rivers of Alaska
Rivers of Nome Census Area, Alaska
Rivers of Unorganized Borough, Alaska